Shijak transmitter was a broadcasting station for mediumwave and shortwave south of Shijak, Albania. It had 5 masts taller than 100 metres, whereby the tallest mast with a height of 130 metres was the tallest man-made structure in Albania. All antennas were demolished in 2019.

Coordinates 
 : 130 metres tall mast
 : 111 metres tall mast
 : 112 metres tall mast
 : 112 metres tall mast
 : 111 metres tall mast

See also 
 Fllake transmitter

External links 
 

Telecommunications in Albania
Buildings and structures in Shijak
Mass media in Shijak